Roger Lea MacBride (August 6, 1929 – March 5, 1995) was an American lawyer, political figure, writer, and television producer.  He was the presidential nominee of the Libertarian Party in the 1976 election. MacBride became the first presidential elector in U.S. history to cast a vote for a woman when, in the presidential election of 1972, he voted for the Libertarian Party candidates John Hospers for president and Theodora "Tonie" Nathan for vice president.

He was co-creator and co-producer of the television series Little House on the Prairie.

Background
MacBride was born in 1929 in New Rochelle, New York, the son of Elise Fairfax (Lea) and William Burt MacBride, an editor. He called himself "the adopted grandson" of a family friend, writer and political theorist Rose Wilder Lane, whom he met when he was 14 years of age. Lane, daughter of Laura Ingalls Wilder, noted author of the Little House series of books, designated MacBride as her "political disciple," executor, and sole heir.

MacBride was a graduate of Princeton University and Harvard Law School.

Law career
MacBride worked for Wall Street law firm White & Case for several years before opening a small practice in Vermont. By the mid-1970s, MacBride had relocated to Virginia and was no longer practicing law full time.

Writing and television producing career
MacBride inherited Lane's estate,  which granted him rights to the substantial Ingalls–Wilder literary estate, including the Little House franchise. He was author of record for three additional Little House books and launched the Rocky Ridge Years series of children's novels, describing Lane's Ozark childhood. He published two books on constitutional law, The American Electoral College and Treaties versus the Constitution, and authored a Libertarian Party manifesto: A New Dawn for America: The Libertarian Challenge.

In the 1970s, MacBride co-created the television series Little House on the Prairie and served as a co-producer for the show.

Political career

Vermont politics
MacBride was elected to the Vermont House of Representatives in 1962 and served one term. While in the state legislature he proposed the abolition of the state college system.

Running as a Goldwater Republican, he made an unsuccessful bid for the Republican Party nomination for Governor of Vermont in 1964.

1972 electoral vote
MacBride was the treasurer of the Republican Party of Virginia in 1972 and one of the party's electors when Richard Nixon won the popular vote for his second term as president of the United States. MacBride, however, as a "faithless elector," voted for the nominees of the Libertarian Party: presidential candidate John Hospers and vice-presidential candidate Tonie Nathan. In doing so, MacBride made Nathan the first woman in U.S. history to receive an Electoral College vote. Political pundit David Boaz later commented in Liberty magazine that MacBride was "faithless to Nixon and Agnew, anyway, but faithful to the constitutional principles Rose Wilder Lane had instilled in him."

1976 presidential campaign

After casting his electoral vote in 1972, MacBride gained favor within the fledgling Libertarian Party, which had been founded the previous year.  As the Libertarian presidential nominee in 1976, he achieved ballot access in 32 states, campaigning on a platform of support for a free market system, a return to the gold standard, the abolition of the Federal Reserve, an end to corporate welfare, the abolition of the FCC, a foreign policy of non-interventionism, and the abolition of  victimless crimes. MacBride and his running mate David Bergland received 172,553 (0.2%) popular votes but no electoral votes. His best performance was in Alaska, where he received 6,785 votes, or nearly 5.5%.

Republican Liberty Caucus
MacBride rejoined the Republican Party in the 1980s and helped establish the Republican Liberty Caucus, a group promoting libertarian principles within the Republican Party.
He chaired this group from 1992 until his death in 1995.

Family
MacBride married Susan Ford. They then adopted a baby whom they named Abigail MacBride.

Laura Ingalls Wilder literary estate
MacBride was designated by Rose Wilder Lane as her heir. He gained control of her literary estate on her death in 1968. In 1971 he published The First Four Years. In 1974 he edited and published Laura Ingalls Wilder's letters to her husband Almanzo as West From Home. He later created and produced the Little House on the Prairie television series. He was the credited author of a fictionalized series on the life of Rose Wilder Lane.

Death
MacBride died of heart failure on March 5, 1995. A controversy ensued when the local library in Mansfield, Missouri, contended that Wilder's original will gave her daughter ownership of the literary estate for her lifetime only, and that all rights were to revert to the Laura Ingalls Wilder Library after her death. The ensuing court case was settled in an undisclosed manner, but MacBride's heirs retained the rights.

In an obituary for MacBride, David Boaz wrote: "In some ways he was the last living link to the best of the Old Right, the rugged-individualist, anti-New Deal, anti-interventionist spirit of Rep. Howard Buffett, Albert Jay Nock, H. L. Mencken, Isabel Paterson, and Lane."

Partial bibliography
 Series on the early life of Rose Wilder
 Little House on Rocky Ridge (1993)
 Little Farm in the Ozarks (1994)
 In the Land of the Big Red Apple (1995)
 On the Other Side of the Hill (1995)
 Little Town in the Ozarks (1996)
 New Dawn on Rocky Ridge (1997)
 On the Banks of the Bayou (1998)
 Bachelor Girl (1999)
 A New Dawn for America: the Libertarian Challenge

References

External links

  (previous page of browse report, under 'MacBride, Roger Lea, 1929–' without '1995')
 Interview with Roger Lea MacBride about Little House on Rocky Ridge, All Abut Kids! TV Series #143 (1993)
 Interview with Roger Lea MacBride about The Little Farm in the Ozarks, All About Kids! TV Series #186 (1994)

1929 births
1995 deaths
20th-century American businesspeople
20th-century American lawyers
20th-century American male writers
20th-century American non-fiction writers
20th-century American politicians
American children's writers
American legal writers
American male non-fiction writers
American political writers
Candidates in the 1976 United States presidential election
Faithless electors
Harvard Law School alumni
Libertarian Party (United States) presidential nominees
Republican Party members of the Vermont House of Representatives
Monetary reformers
New York (state) lawyers
Non-interventionism
Old Right (United States)
Politicians from New Rochelle, New York
Princeton University alumni
Television producers from New York (state)
Vermont lawyers
Virginia lawyers
Virginia Libertarians
Virginia Republicans
Writers from New Rochelle, New York
Writers from Vermont
Writers from Virginia